Beddington is a surname, and may refer to:

Jack Beddington (1893–1959), British advertising executive during World War II
John Beddington (born 1945), population biologist, Chief Scientific Adviser to the UK Government from 2008 to 2013
Reginald Beddington (1877–1962), English angler and humanitarian
Rosa Beddington (1956–2001), developmental biologist
Roy Beddington (1910–1995), British painter, illustrator, fisherman, poet, writer on fishing, and journalist
Sarah Beddington (born 1964), British artist and filmmaker

English toponymic surnames
English-language surnames
Surnames of English origin
Surnames of British Isles origin